The House of Habsburg-Este, also known as the House of Austria-Este and holder of the title of Archduke of Austria-Este, is a cadet branch of the House of Habsburg-Lorraine and also descends from the House of Este in the cognatic line. It was created in 1771 with the marriage between Ferdinand of Habsburg-Lorraine and Maria Beatrice d'Este, only daughter of the Duke of Modena, Ercole III d'Este. After the death of Ercole III in 1803, the Modena ruling branch of the Este family's male line ended, and the Habsburg-Este line subsequently inherited his possessions in what is now Italy.

History

Origins
Ercole III d'Este, the last Este duke of Modena and Reggio in the direct male line, was deposed in 1796 by the French, and his Italian principality was incorporated into the Cisalpine Republic, later the Napoleonic Kingdom of Italy. In 1814, French rule in Italy ended. Modena was to be returned to his daughter Maria Beatrice and her son Francis of Austria-Este after Ercole's death. Previously, Ercole had been compensated with the duchy of Breisgau in south-western Germany; the Habsburgs ceded this province to him in anticipation of it falling eventually to the Habsburg family again, since Ercole's sole daughter was married to a cadet Habsburg, Archduke Ferdinand of Austria-Este. Ercole died in 1803 and Breisgau was indeed inherited by his daughter and her husband, but they lost it in 1805 to the expanding Grand Duchy of Baden.

Rule on the Emilia
The family, cognatically descended from the Estes, ruled the Duchy of Modena and Reggio again from 1814 to 1859, using the names Asburgo-Este (Habsburg-Este) and its variants, along with the subsidiary titles Duke of Reggio, of Mirandola, of Massa, Prince of Carrara and Lunigniana, and, since 1847, Duke of Guastalla. In 1859, the principality lost its independence and was  incorporated into the newly united Kingdom of Italy, and Francis V, the last duke, was deposed. Francis V, Duke of Modena and Reggio (1846–59, died 1875) withdrew to his estates in Austria.

After the death of his mother in 1840, Francis was considered the legitimate heir to the English and Scottish thrones by the Jacobites (with the regnal title King Francis I). When Francis died in Vienna on 20 November 1875, his family became extinct in the male line. His heir general and heir-of-the-blood was his niece, Archduchess Maria Theresa of Austria-Este (died 1919), who then was married with Prince Ludwig of Bavaria (they later became King and Queen of Bavaria). The heir-general of the Estes continues in their descendants, and the present heir is Franz, Duke of Bavaria.

After Unification and current status
However, Francis V had decided to retain the Este name in the Habsburg family, and left most of his huge estate to his young cousin Archduke Franz Ferdinand of Austria, with certain conditions, one of which is that the heir and future heirs use the name of Este. The non-territorial property of the Este family thus fell to the line of Archduke Charles Louis, younger brother to then Emperor Francis Joseph, Austria-Este then becoming a sort of "secundogeniture" title within the Austrian imperial family.

Although the first heir, Archduke Franz Ferdinand (1863-1914), was not a descendant of the last Este duchess, Mary Beatrice of Modena, he took the name Austria-Este. In 1896 he became the heir presumptive of the Austrian Empire and, according to the terms of the secundogeniture, could not combine the Austria-Este inheritance with that of the main line of the House of Habsburg, i.e., the Austro-Hungarian Empire; but he was assassinated 28 June 1914 in Sarajevo before becoming emperor. Because Franz Ferdinand's children were born in morganatic marriage (see House of Hohenberg), on 16 April 1917 Emperor Charles I of Austria, as head of the House of Habsburg, issued letters patent conferring the name, arms and patrimony of Austria-Este on his son, Archduke Robert, and his future issue according to masculine primogeniture. Through his mother Zita of Bourbon-Parma, Robert happened to be a descendant of Duke Ercole III of Modena and Reggio as well, and thus the blood of the last Este dukes was joined with the name Austria-Este.

On Robert's death his eldest son, Archduke Lorenz, born 1955, by his wife, Princess Margherita of Savoy, succeeded him in that role. He is married to Princess Astrid of Belgium, a daughter of King Albert II of Belgium. Since the throne of Belgium is heritable by females (and males no longer have precedence over females), Princess Astrid is an heir of Belgium immediately after the issue of King Philippe of Belgium. As such, her husband Archduke Lorenz of Austria-Este, was in 1995 elevated to the additional title of Prince of Belgium. The children of the couple are, since 1991, titled Archduke (Archduchess) of Austria-Este and Prince(ss) of Belgium. The eldest of these is Prince Amedeo of Belgium, Archduke of Austria-Este, born 1986.

Coat of arms

See also
List of Dukes of Ferrara and of Modena

References

External links
 Heraldry of the House of Habsburg-Lorraine
 Arms of the Este dukes of Modena 

 
House of Habsburg-Lorraine
1771 establishments in the Habsburg monarchy